Ronald Barry "Whitey" Martin (born April 11, 1939) is a former NBA basketball player for the New York Knicks. Martin received his nickname "Whitey," because of bleach-blond hair color. In college, Martin was mainly known as an exceptional ballhandler and defensive player.  In a 1961 Sports Illustrated article, Martin was described as a "6-foot-2 sandy-haired senior with hands as quick as a nervous pickpocket."  Martin was drafted with the first pick in the second round of the 1961 NBA Draft. He played sixty-six games in the 1961-62 NBA season for the Knicks and averaged 3.4 points per game, 2.4 rebounds per game and 1.7 assists per game.

References

1939 births
Living people
American men's basketball players
Basketball players from Buffalo, New York
New York Knicks draft picks
New York Knicks players
Point guards
St. Bonaventure Bonnies men's basketball players